Juquitiba is a suburban municipality in the southeastern part of the state of São Paulo in Brazil. It is part of the Metropolitan Region of São Paulo. The population is 31,646 (2020 est.) in an area of 522.17 km². This name comes from the Tupi language. The southern part of the municipality is heavily forested with the Serra do Mar mountain range, the central and the northern parts are predominantly hilly.

The municipality contains part of the  Serra do Mar Environmental Protection Area, created in 1984.

Population history

Tourism
Tourism is a strong point of Juquitiba. Just 70 km from the state capital, offers contact with the animals and plants of the Atlantic forest. It offers various adventure sports like river rafting Juquiá, for example, along with numerous trails and waterfalls. The county contains hostels, campsites and fishing to leisure and hospitality.

References

External links

  Prefeitura Municipal de Juquitiba

Municipalities in São Paulo (state)
Populated places established in 1964